The Administrative Code of Belarus is the set of laws that codify administrative law in Belarus.

History

The Belarusian administrative code was updated on 1 March 2021, strengthening penalties for several actions in relation to civil disobedience.

Offences

Civil disobedience
Since 1 March 2021, Section 24 of the administrative code includes articles covering civil disobedience. Participation in unsanctioned mass events is punishable by up to 15 days of arrest, or up to 30 days if the offense is repeated, under Article 24.23. Community service from eight to 60 hours can be given as an alternative sentence.

Disobedience to a lawful demand of an official, in practice during political protests, is punishable under Article 24.3. The "illegal use and manufacture of flags and symbols" is punishable under Article 24.26.

Bodily harm
The intentional infliction of bodily harm or other violence that causes insignificant injury is publishable by a fine or administrative arrest under Article 9.1 of the code.

Fairness of trials
As of 2022, court cases in Belarus are often scheduled ten minutes apart from one another and can conclude in as little three minutes, and have been criticized for being "not a court". Consistently from 2016 through 2020, trials resulting in a guilty verdict occurred at a frequency of 99.7% and  99.8%.

See also
Criminal Code of Belarus
Show trial

References

Law of Belarus